Min-Liang Tan or Tan Min Liang (born 5 November 1977) is a Singaporean businessman, internet entrepreneur and former lawyer. He is the co-founder, chairman, chief executive officer (CEO) and creative director of the gaming hardware company Razer Inc., as well as being the chairman and CEO of THX. He oversees the design and development of all Razer products. Tan was a lawyer before he co-founded Razer with Robert Krakoff.

Apart from Razer, Tan is a founding member of the Open Source Virtual Reality platform, which aims to create a common standard for VR program design. The next frontier for Razer has been said to lie in the realm of virtual reality, and Tan hopes to create an entire virtual reality industry, citing that the prospects are “phenomenal” in entertainment, health care and military applications. Tan is also a board member of the Intellectual Property Office of Singapore (IPOS).

Tan debuted in 2016 on the Forbes Singapore Rich List with a net worth of US$600 million and became the youngest self-made Singaporean billionaire at the age of 40 with a net worth of US$1.6 billion when Razer went public in 2017.

Early life and education
Tan was born on 5 November 1977 in Singapore to Tan Kim Lee, a real estate consultant, and Low Ken Yin, a homemaker, Tan is the youngest of four children in his family.

As a Singaporean, he is bilingual, being fluent in both English and Mandarin Chinese. Two of Tan's siblings eventually became doctors, one of whom is the renowned clinician-scientist Tan Min Han (who is also the founder, CEO  and medical director of Singaporean genomic medicine company Lucence Diagnostics).

Tan attended Raffles Institution and Hwa Chong Junior College prior to attending university and graduated from the National University of Singapore Faculty of Law (NUS Law). Tan graduated with a Master of Laws, and was ranked top 20 in his post-graduate law class when he graduated in 2002.

Career
Prior to founding Razer, Tan was an advocate and solicitor for the Supreme Court of Singapore.

In 1999, Tan and Robert Krakoff (who was GM of kärna LLC) first met and worked together to design the world's first gaming mouse — the "Razer Boomslang".

In 2005, Tan and  Krakoff founded Razer. Subsequently, Tan acquired the rights to the brand and officially incorporated Razer Inc, subsequently taking on the role of CEO and Creative Director of Razer.

On March 31, 2015, Tan was appointed as a board member of Intellectual Property Office of Singapore (IPOS).

On November 13, 2017, Razer had their IPO and Tan became the youngest self-made Singaporean billionaire at the age of 40.

Fan base and reputation 
Tan has a cult-like following worldwide and his fans have created fansites of him as well as even tattooed Tan's name on themselves. One of his fans has gone as far as tattooing Tan's face on himself.

In December 2019 Kotaku published an exposé based on the statements of 14 former Razer employees, containing wide allegations that under Tan's leadership Razer celebrates a culture of fear, and that Tan himself berates, threatens and shames his staff.

Awards 
Tan was included in the "Top 10 Most Influential Leaders in Tech" in 2015 by Juniper Research. Tan was named one of "The 25 Most Creative People in Tech" by Business Insider. He has been ranked one of the top 40 most powerful people in gaming by Kotaku in their "The Kotaku Power 40" list. Tan was ranked No. 1 of the 30 top Southeast Asia tech founders by TechinAsia. Tan was named the Asian of the Year in 2016 by Singaporean newspaper The Straits Times.

He has won awards from his alma mater, the National University of Singapore (NUS), including their Outstanding NUS Innovator Award in 2011, and as one of their Outstanding Young Alumni in 2015.

Philanthropy
In March 2012, Tan contributed US$10,000 to the Wasteland 2 Kickstarter project where he admitted it was to atone for infringing the copyright of Wasteland when he was a child. Brian Fargo replies that Tan has more than made up for his downloading of the game.

In November 2014, Tan donated US$10,000 and did the Ice Bucket Challenge in an effort to raise funds for ALS.

In February 2015, Tan donated £10,000 to fight Motor Neuron Disease. The donation was done via Twitch live stream subscription to ProSyndicate.

Media appearances 
Tan was a backer of Wasteland 2  and Torment: Tides of Numenera on Kickstarter which resulted in him being added to both games as a non-player character. He also appears in Shroud of the Avatar: Forsaken Virtues.

Tan has also had cameos in movies like Dead Rising: Watchtower where he acted as a zombie.

Notes

References

External links
Facebook

Min-Liang Tan on Weibo

1977 births
Living people
Former billionaires
Hwa Chong Junior College alumni
National University of Singapore alumni
Raffles Institution alumni
Razer Inc.
Singaporean chairpersons of corporations
Singaporean chief executives
Singaporean people of Chinese descent